Madhabpur refers to a village in Srirampore subdivision in Hooghly district, West Bengal, India.

It also refers to:
 Madhabpur Upazila, an upazila (sub-distrcict) in Habiganj District, Sylhet Division, Bangladesh
 Madhabpur, Purba Medinipur, a village in Egra subdivision of Purba Medinipur district, West Bengal, India
 Madhabpur, Hooghly, a village in Arambagh subdivision of Hooghly district, West Bengal, India